Houston Southwest Airport or Houston-Southwest Airport  is a public-use airport located in Arcola, a city in Fort Bend County, Texas, United States, 15 miles (24 km) southwest of the central business district of Houston. It is privately owned by James Griffith, Jr.

Although most U.S. airports use the same three-letter location identifier for the FAA and IATA, Houston Southwest Airport is assigned AXH by the FAA but has no designation from the IATA.

Facilities and aircraft 
For the 12-month period ending January 27, 2006, the airport had 46,381 aircraft operations, an average of 127 per day: 98% general aviation, 2% military and <1% air taxi. At that time there were 151 aircraft based at this airport: 74% single-engine and 26% multi-engine.

References

External links 

Airports in Texas
Airports in Greater Houston
Buildings and structures in Fort Bend County, Texas
Transportation in Fort Bend County, Texas